is a Japanese ice hockey player and member of the Japanese national ice hockey team, currently playing with Daishin in the Women's Japan Ice Hockey League (WJIHL) and All-Japan Women's Ice Hockey Championship.

Ito represented Japan at the 2021 IIHF Women's World Championship. At the 2020 Winter Youth Olympics, she won a gold medal in the girls' ice hockey tournament.

References

External links
 
 

Living people
2004 births
Sportspeople from Hokkaido
Japanese women's ice hockey forwards
Ice hockey players at the 2020 Winter Youth Olympics
Youth Olympic gold medalists for Japan
21st-century Japanese women